Jean-Paul Raphaël Sinibaldi (19 May 1857, Paris – 17 January 1909, Bourg-en-Bresse) was a French painter who specialized in portraits and country scenes.

Biography 
He studied at the École des Beaux-Arts, under the direction of Alexandre Cabanel and Alfred Stevens. In 1881, with the support of his teachers, he was able to begin participating in showings at the Salon. Five years later, he was honored with the Prix de Rome and, in 1888, received a large travel grant, given by the "Conseil supérieur des beaux-arts".

The following year, he was awarded a bronze medal at the Exposition Universelle. He won a silver medal at the Exposition Universelle of 1900 and, that same year was named a Knight in the Legion of Honor.

Most of his clients were private individuals, but he received a few public contracts; notably, decorations for a hall in the Hôtel de Ville, and in the wedding chapel at the town hall in Lille. In 1897, he was commissioned to design an office for the Ministry of Economic Affairs.

References

Further reading 

 Anna Zsófia Kovács, « Aurore de Paul Sinibaldi : allégorie insondable ou métaphore politique ? », Bulletin du musée hongrois des Beaux-Arts, n° 124 (2019), p. 119-135. Available on Academia.edu 
 Emmanuel Bénézit (Ed.): Dictionnaire critique et documentaire des peintres, sculpteurs, dessinateurs et graveurs de tous les temps et de tous les pays. Neuaufl. Grund, Paris 1999
 La Chronique des arts et de la curiosité @ the Bibliothèque nationale de France

External links 
Jean Paul Sinibaldi, Break of Day, 1893, Museum of Fine Arts, Budapest
More works by Sinibaldi @ ArtNet

19th-century French painters
French portrait painters
French genre painters
Painters from Paris
1857 births
1909 deaths
20th-century French painters